Despoina "Despo" Diamantidou (13 July 1916 – 18 February 2004) was a Greek actress. She appeared in more than seventy films from 1949 to 2003. She played Tatiana in Alan King's summer replacement sitcom, Ivan the Terrible starring Lou Jacobi, which aired on ABC from 21 August to 18 September 1976.

Filmography

References

External links 

1916 births
2004 deaths
Greek film actresses
Actors from Piraeus